Loxostege fascialis is a species of moth in the family Crambidae.  It is found in France, Spain, Italy, Austria, Slovakia, Hungary, Croatia, Bosnia and Herzegovina, Romania and Russia.

References

Lepiforum.de

Moths described in 1796
Pyraustinae
Moths of Europe